Al-Tall Al-Zaynabiyya is the name of a holy place in Karbala, Iraq. It overlooks the site of the martyrdom of Husayn ibn Ali, who was killed during the Battle of Karbala on the day of Ashura.

During the Battle of Karbala, Ali ibn Abi Talib's daughter and Husayn's sister (Zaynab) went to Tall Zaynabiyya to stay informed about the status of Ali ibn Abi Talib's son, Husayn ibn Ali.

Al-Tall Al-Zaynabiyya is located at the southwest of Husayn's shrine is well regarded among Shia shrines. It is approximately five meters higher than the floor of the courtyard; its distance to the place where Husayn ibn Ali was killed is almost 35 meters. The site was built like a room with access to a few stages and has a dome with blue tiles. The Tall al-Zaynabiyya was rebuilt in 1978 (near the end of 1398 AH).

Meaning 
In Arabic, the word tall means a projection of soil or sand on the ground, and the word zaynabiyya is related to Zaynab, Ali ibn Abi Talib's daughter.

See also

 List of casualties in Husayn's army at the Battle of Karbala
 Family tree of Muhammad

References 

Battle of Karbala
Shia Islam
Islamic terminology
Shia shrines